Indie Recordings is a Norwegian record label focusing on hard rock and heavy metal, founded in 2005 by Erik and Espen Røhne as a side project of Indie Distribution. In 2006, Erlend Gjerde joined Indie Recordings and Indie Distribution and together they developed the label from a "hobby project" into one of the leading independent record labels in Scandinavia, releasing gold albums by bands Kvelertak and Satyricon. Indie Recordings has mainly focused on developing Norwegian acts like 1349, Kvelertak, Satyricon, Enslaved, God Seed, Keep of Kalessin, Wardruna, Audrey Horne, and Oslo Ess. However, the label has also signed foreign acts such as Cult of Luna, Hacride, and Steak Number Eight.

Current roster

 1349
 Aura Noir
 Azusa
 Atena
 Blood Tsunami
 Cult of Luna
 Einherjer
 Extol
 Fixation
 Fleshkiller
 Gehenna
 Glittertind
 God Seed
 Halcyon Days
 In Vain
 Iskald
 Kampfar
 Keep of Kalessin
 King
 Kvelertak
 Man The Machetes
 Maraton
 Mencea
 Ov Hell
 Saturnian
 Sahg
 Sarke
 Satyricon
 Shining
 Skambankt
 Solefald
 Stonegard
 Tantara
 Trinacria
 Vreid
 Wardruna

Former artists

 Audrey Horne
 Borknagar
 Cronian
 Enslaved
 Funeral
 Legion of the Damned
 NettleCarrier
 Red Harvest
 Tulus

 Norway only

References

External links
 Indie Recordings
 Indie Distribution

Norwegian record labels
Heavy metal record labels
Record labels established in 2006